Z.C.B.J. Opera House is an historic building located in Clarkson, Nebraska, United States, that was built in 1913 by the Zapadni Ceska Bratrska Jednota, or Western Bohemian Fraternal Association. It was listed on the National Register of Historic Places on September 28, 1988. The building serves as a meeting hall for the Czech community.  It has hosted operas, dances, lectures, films and Czech heritage events.

Sound films were shown in the opera house beginning in the 1930s.

See also
 Czech-Slovak Protective Society

References

External links
 State grant helps keep piece of history alive

Czech-American culture in Nebraska
Buildings and structures in Colfax County, Nebraska
Clubhouses on the National Register of Historic Places in Nebraska
Music venues completed in 1913
Opera houses in Nebraska
Theatres on the National Register of Historic Places in Nebraska
Western Fraternal Life Association
Theatres completed in 1913
1913 establishments in Nebraska
National Register of Historic Places in Colfax County, Nebraska
Opera houses on the National Register of Historic Places in Nebraska